The men's 400 metres hurdles at the 2014 European Athletics Championships took place at the Letzigrund on 12, 13 and 15 August.

Medalists

Records

Schedule

Results

Round 1

First 4 in each heat (Q) and 4 best performers (q) advance to the Semifinals.

Semifinals
First 2 in each heat (Q) and 2 best performers (q) advance to the Final.

Final

References

Round 1 Results
Semifinal Results
Final Results

Hurdles 400 M
400 metres hurdles at the European Athletics Championships